1001 Albums You Must Hear Before You Die is a musical reference book first published in 2005 by Universe Publishing. Part of the 1001 Before You Die series, it compiles writings and information on albums chosen by a panel of music critics to be the most important, influential, and best in popular music between the 1950s and the 2010s. The book is edited by Robert Dimery, an English writer and editor who had previously worked for magazines such as Time Out and Vogue.

Each entry in the book's roughly chronological list of albums is accompanied by a short essay written by a music critic, along with pictures, quotes, and additional information (such as the album's running time and producer). Compilations of various artists, and most film soundtracks, are excluded.

Selection and sorting methodology
In the book's introduction, general editor Robert Dimery notes that the selections were also intended to bring attention to gifted songwriters. Joni Mitchell, Elvis Costello and Nick Cave are named as examples. The release dates are chosen from the date the album first released in the artist's home country, and the version is the first one released. In most cases, bonus tracks added for later versions are ignored. The editors also attempted to ensure that each album profiled was still available for purchase. Soundtracks that were not original material from a particular artist were also excluded.

Editions
The 2005 edition starts with Frank Sinatra's In the Wee Small Hours, and ends with Get Behind Me Satan by the White Stripes. As the book has been reissued several times, some albums are removed in each edition to make space for more recent albums.

The 2010 edition ends with It's Blitz! by the Yeah Yeah Yeahs, while 2013 edition ends with The Next Day by David Bowie. The 2016 edition ends with Blackstar, also by David Bowie. The 2018 edition ends with Microshift by Hookworms. The 2021 edition ends with Heaux Tales by Jazmine Sullivan.

Critical reception 
Writing for The Sun-Herald in November 2005, John Clare said that he loved the book and that it "is good-looking and has a great body" which is "perfectly proportioned", being "fat but not too wide or tall". Of the jazz albums included in the book, Clare felt that "all are well chosen except one"; he thought that the inclusion of two Stan Getz albums was too many given the absence of a Louis Armstrong album. In a more critical review in the same month, Matt Price of The Australian said that "[t]he whole premise of the book is humbug", arguing that it would take too long to listen through all the albums in the book whilst also following new releases. He also criticized several of the book's choices on what albums to include and to not include, concluding that it was "biased, un-Australian and unacceptable". 

In February 2006, Publishers Weekly called the book a "bookshelf-busting testament to music geeks' mania for lists" and said it was "about as comprehensive a 'best-of' as any sane person could want". The reviewer added: "For music lovers, it doesn't get much better." Mirela Roncevic reviewed the book for Library Journal in May of that year, citing it as an example of a reference work that is "highly enjoyable to browse" and "downright addictive". Grant Alden also reviewed the book in May 2006 for No Depression. He stated that he was unaware of most of the critics who contributed to the book and was of the opinion that "[y]ou don't have to hear all these". He also criticized the relative lack of albums included in the book from the 1950s compared to later decades.

Genres 
Most of the book's recommendations are rock and pop albums from the Western world. 1001 Albums also features selections from world music, rhythm and blues, blues, folk, hip hop, country, electronic music, and jazz. The rock and pop albums include such subgenres as punk rock, grindcore, heavy metal, alternative rock, progressive rock, easy listening, thrash metal, grunge and rockabilly. Classical and modern art music are excluded.

Artists 

These artists have the most albums in the 2017 edition.

 9 albums: David Bowie, John Lennon (2 solo albums and 7 Beatles albums), Paul McCartney (1 solo album, 1 Wings album and 7 Beatles albums), Neil Young (7 solo albums, 1 Buffalo Springfield album and 1 Crosby, Stills, Nash & Young album).
 8 albums: George Harrison (1 solo album and 7 Beatles albums).
 7 albums: The Beatles, Bob Dylan, Brian Eno (4 solo albums, 2 Roxy Music albums and 1 collaborative album with David Byrne; he was also involved with producing 7 additional albums listed in the book: 3 Talking Heads albums, 3 U2 albums and 1 Devo album), Morrissey (4 solo albums and 3 The Smiths albums).
 6 albums: Nick Cave (1 The Birthday Party album and 5 Nick Cave and the Bad Seeds albums), Elvis Costello (3 solo albums and 3 The Attractions albums), The Rolling Stones, Paul Simon (3 solo albums and 3 Simon and Garfunkel albums).
 5 albums: The Byrds, Nick Cave and the Bad Seeds, Peter Gabriel (3 solo albums and 2 Genesis albums), Iggy Pop (2 solo albums and 3 The Stooges albums), Led Zeppelin, Lou Reed (2 solo albums and 3 The Velvet Underground albums), Sonic Youth, Bruce Springsteen, Stephen Stills (2 solo albums, 1 Buffalo Springfield album, 1 Crosby, Stills & Nash album and 1 Crosby, Stills, Nash & Young album), Tom Waits, The Who.
 4 albums: Leonard Cohen, Eric Clapton (1 solo album, 1 Cream album, 1 Derek and the Dominos album and 1 collaborative album with John Mayall), Miles Davis, P.J. Harvey, The Kinks, Metallica, Joni Mitchell, Pink Floyd, Radiohead, R.E.M., Steely Dan, Talking Heads, U2, Paul Weller (1 solo album, 2 The Jam albums and 1 The Style Council album), Björk (3 solo album, 1 Sugarcubes albums), Stevie Wonder.
 3 albums: Aerosmith, The Beach Boys, Beastie Boys, Black Sabbath, Blur, Tim Buckley, Kate Bush, Johnny Cash, Creedence Clearwater Revival, The Cure, Deep Purple, Dexys Midnight Runners, The Doors, Nick Drake, Echo & the Bunnymen, The Fall, Madonna, Marvin Gaye, The Jimi Hendrix Experience, Michael Jackson, Kraftwerk, John Lydon (1 album with the Sex Pistols and 2 albums with Public Image Ltd.), Bob Marley and the Wailers, Van Morrison, My Bloody Valentine, Nirvana, Parliament/Funkadelic, Pet Shop Boys, Pixies, Elvis Presley, Prince (2 solo albums and 1 The Revolution album), Public Enemy, Queen, Robert Wyatt (2 solo albums and 1 Soft Machine album), Roxy Music, Frank Sinatra, Kanye West, Wilco, Yes, Frank Zappa, Fiona Apple

See also 
 Album era
 Rolling Stones 500 Greatest Albums of All Time
 1,000 Recordings to Hear Before You Die
 1001 Movies You Must See Before You Die
 1001 Books You Must Read Before You Die
 1001 Video Games You Must Play Before You Die

References

External links 
 1001 Albums You Must Hear Before You Die website
1001 Albums You Must Hear Before You Die Generator

2005 non-fiction books
Music guides